Goli Jan Rural District is a rural district (dehestan) in the Central District of Tonekabon County, Mazandaran Province, Iran. At the 2006 census, its population was 34,341, in 9,815 families. The rural district has 96 villages.

References 

Rural Districts of Mazandaran Province
Tonekabon County